Styliferina is a genus of sea snails, marine gastropod mollusks in the family Litiopidae.

Species
Species within the genus Styliferina include:
 Styliferina goniochila A. Adams, 1860
 Styliferina lepida A. Adams, 1862
 Styliferina orthochila A. Adams, 1860
 Styliferina translucida (Hedley, 1905)
Species brought into synonymy
 Styliferina turrita Carpenter, 1866: synonym of Alabina turrita (Carpenter, 1866)
Nomen dubium
 Styliferina callosa A. Adams, 1870

References

 Vaught, K.C. (1989). A classification of the living Mollusca. American Malacologists: Melbourne, FL (USA). . XII, 195 pp.

Litiopidae